Fih (or Fiaa) is a Greek Orthodox Christian village situated in Koura District of Lebanon.

The name "Fih" is derived from an Aramaic root. Its meanings include "the place where the sheep bleat", "the abundance and exuberance", "the beautiful and charming" and "of wind and breeze".

The High Hill
Since the Phoenician age the tradition was to choose high ground to build altars and temples.

The tradition is referenced in the Bible: "For they also built them high places, and images, and groves, on every high hill, and under every green tree." 

Fih is one of the highest hill in El-Koura overlooking the coast and was one of the most important sacred hills in the region. Fih remains the center of the celebration of St. Simon, its patron saint. The shrine is surrounded by cemeteries.

Father Nicola Yanney
Fr. Nicola Yanney was born  in Fi'eh al-Koura and emigrated to the United States around 1893, settling in Nebraska. In 1904, he was ordained a priest by Bishop Raphael Hawaweeny. He was the first permanent pastor of St. George Orthodox Church in Kearney, Nebraska, though he also ministered throughout the Midwest to communities in nineteen states including Missouri, Nebraska, Michigan, Minnesota, North Dakota, Iowa, Illinois, Wisconsin, Kentucky, and Kansas. Fr. Yanney was an important figure in the early Syrian (Lebanese) Orthodox Church in America and the first to serve the Orthodox community in the Midwest. He died in 1918 from the Spanish Flu. A detailed biography of Fr. Yanney's life is available via the website of the Moise A. Khayrallah Center for Lebanese Diaspora Studies.

References

Christian communities in Lebanon
Eastern Orthodox Christian communities in Lebanon
Populated places in the North Governorate
Koura District